Catasetum laminatum, the scaled catasetum, is a species of orchid found in Mexico.

References

External links

laminatum
Orchids of Mexico